Joyful Journeys is a 2018 Sri Lankan Sinhala drama film directed and produced by Udayakantha Warnasuriya. It stars Hemasiri Liyanage in lead role along with Nalin Pradeep Udawela, Madani Malwattage and Kumara Thirimadura. Music composed by Navaratne Gamage.

The film has been shot around Nuwara Eliya, Colombo and Tharangani Cinema Hall. The film received mostly positive reviews from critics.

Synopsis

The film about Wilson Godamanne, an 85-year old former film actor, who lives with his son, daughter in law and two grandchildren in the picturesque hill country of Sri Lanka.

The film captures the lives of ordinary folk. Nostalgically reaching out for his former glory, Wilson decides to attend a film festival showing one of his films. Accompanied by his 8-year-old grandson, Wilson arrives in time to see himself. On his way to catch his bus, he is stricken fatally by a heart attack. With only a helpless child at hand,Wilson experiences the compassion of strangers and friends. The film leaves behind a lasting impression of the need of humans to find value in themselves especially as the light of life begins to fade.

Cast
 Hemasiri Liyanage as Wilson Godamanne
 Nalin Pradeep Udawela as Jaye
 Madani Malwattage as Sujaatha
 Sudam Katukitule as Wilson's grandson
 Sarath Chandrasiri as Sudath
 Kumara Thirimadura as Bus conductor
 Dharmapriya Dias as Threewheel driver
 Ramani Alakolanga
 Ajith Lokuge
 Chathura Perera
 Wilman Sirimanne as Rathne ayya, the bus driver
 Nilmini Tennakoon in special appearance
 Kelum Srimal as Announcer
 Ravindra Randeniya in special appearance
 Channa Perera in special appearance
 Udari Warnakulasooriya in special appearance
 Manjula Yalegama as Photographer
 Rajasinghe Loluwagoda as Servant

Awards
 Amsterdam Film Festival - Jury Award

References

External links
 
 මධුර චාරිකා රූ සිරි වරුණ
 [මධුර චාරිකා සම්පුර්ණ චිත්‍රපටය Gluuoo වෙතින් නරඹන්න]

2018 films
2018 drama films
Sri Lankan drama films
Films directed by Udayakantha Warnasuriya